St George's Church is a parish church in the Church of England in Barton in Fabis, Nottinghamshire.

History

The church is medieval and is a Grade I listed building. St George's Church was restored in 1855 by Thomas Chambers Hine. Between 1931 and 1934 the nave roof and parapet were repaired at a cost of £725 by Charles Marriott Oldrid Scott, architect, and Thomas Long, builder.

The church is famous for the alabaster tomb in the chancel dating from 1616 with reclining effigies of William and Tabitha Sacheverell.

Incumbents

Parish structure
It is part of an informal grouping of five churches that are known collectively as "The 453 Churches" as they straddle the A453. The other churches in the group are:
St. Lawrence's Church, Gotham
St. Winifred's Church, Kingston on Soar
Holy Trinity Church, Ratcliffe-on-Soar
All Saints’ Church, Thrumpton

Organ
The two manual pipe organ dates from 1893 and is by the builder Alexander Young. It was installed in 1965. It came from Wincham Methodist Church. A specification of the organ can be found on the National Pipe Organ Register.

Bells
The west tower contains a ring of six bells.

See also
Grade I listed buildings in Nottinghamshire
Listed buildings in Barton in Fabis

References

External links
 Southwell & Nottingham church history project

Church of England church buildings in Nottinghamshire
Grade I listed churches in Nottinghamshire